The 1947–48 Michigan Tech Huskies men's ice hockey season was the 27th season of play for the program but first under the oversight of the NCAA. The Huskies represented the Clarkson College of Technology and were coached by Ed Maki, in his 6th season.

Season

Roster

Standings

Schedule and results

|-
!colspan=12 style=";" | Regular Season

References

Michigan Tech Huskies men's ice hockey seasons
Michigan Tech
Michigan Tech
Michigan Tech